Pakubuwono IV (also transliterated Pakubuwana IV) (31 August 1768 – 1 October 1820) was the fourth Susuhunan (ruler of Surakarta) . He reigned from 1788 to 1820.

Notes

References
Miksic, John N. (general ed.), et al. (2006)  Karaton Surakarta. A look into the court of Surakarta Hadiningrat, central Java (First published: 'By the will of His Serene Highness Paku Buwono XII'. Surakarta: Yayasan Pawiyatan Kabudayan Karaton Surakarta, 2004)  Marshall Cavendish Editions  Singapore  

Burials at Imogiri
Susuhunan of Surakarta
1768 births
1820 deaths
Indonesian royalty